The flag of Puerto Rico represents and symbolizes Puerto Rico and its people.

The origins of the current flag of Puerto Rico, adopted by the Commonwealth of Puerto Rico in 1952, can be traced to 1868, when the first Puerto Rican flag, "The Revolutionary Flag of Lares", was conceived by Dr. Ramón Emeterio Betances and embroidered by Mariana "Brazos de Oro" Bracetti. This flag was used in the short-lived Puerto Rican revolt against Spanish rule in the island, known as "El Grito de Lares", establishing for the first time a Puerto Rican national consciousness under colonial rule.

Juan de Mata Terreforte, an exiled veteran of "El Grito de Lares" and vice-president of the Puerto Rican Revolutionary Committee, in New York City, adopted with its members the flag of Lares as the flag of Puerto Rico, until 1895, when the current design, modeled after the Cuban flag, was unveiled and adopted by the committee. The new flag, which consisted of five equal horizontal bands of red (top and bottom) alternating with white; a blue isosceles triangle based on the hoist side bears a large, white, five-pointed star in the center, was first flown in Puerto Rico on March 24, 1897, during the "Intentona de Yauco" revolt. (This is contrasted by the usage of three blue and two white equal horizontal stripes and a red equilateral triangle at the hoist with a five-pointed star in the Cuban flag.) The use and display of the Puerto Rican flag was outlawed and the only flags permitted to be flown in Puerto Rico were the Spanish flag (1492 to 1898) and the American flag (1898 to 1952).

In 1952, the Commonwealth of Puerto Rico adopted the 1895 flag design as its official standard. The color of the triangle that was used by the administration of Luis Muñoz Marín was the dark blue, to match the blue of the United States flag. In 1995, the government of Puerto Rico issued a regulation regarding the use of the Puerto Rican flag titled: "Regulation on the Use in the Commonwealth of Puerto Rico of the Flag of Puerto Rico", in which the government specifies the colors to be used but does not specify any official color tones or shades. Therefore, it is not uncommon to see the flag of Puerto Rico with different shades of blue displayed in the commonwealth.

History

Spanish era

The introduction of a flag in Puerto Rico can be traced to when Christopher Columbus landed on the island's shore and with the flag appointed to him by the Spanish Crown claimed the island, which he named "San Juan Bautista", in the name of Spain. Columbus wrote in his logbook that on October 12, 1492, he used the Royal Flag, and that his captains used two flags which the Admiral carried in all the ships as ensign, each white with a green cross in the middle and an 'F' and 'Y', both green and crowned with golden, open royal crowns, for Ferdinand II of Aragon and Ysabel (Isabel I). The conquistadores under the command of Juan Ponce de León proceeded to conquer and settle the island. They carried as their military standard the "Spanish Expedition Flag". After the island was conquered and colonized, the flag of Spain was used in Puerto Rico, same as it was used in all of its other colonies.

Once the Spanish armed forces established themselves on the island they began the construction of military fortifications such as La Fortaleza, Fort San Felipe del Morro, Fort San Cristóbal and San Gerónimo. The Spanish Army designed the "Cross of Burgundy Flag" and adopted it as their standard. This flag flew wherever there was a Spanish military installation.

First indigenous design

The independence movement in Puerto Rico gained momentum with the liberation successes of Simón Bolívar and José de San Martín in South America. In 1868, local independence leader Ramón Emeterio Betances urged Mariana Bracetti to knit a revolutionary flag using the flag of the Dominican Republic as an example, promoting the then popular ideal of uniting the three caribbean islands into an Antillean Confederation. The materials for the flag were provided by Eduvigis Beauchamp Sterling, named Treasurer of the revolution by Betances. The flag was divided in the middle by a white Latin cross, the two lower corners were red and the two upper corners were blue with a white star in the upper left blue corner. According to Puerto Rican poet Luis Lloréns Torres the white cross on it stands for the yearning for homeland redemption; the red squares, the blood poured by the heroes of the rebellion and the white star in the blue solitude square, stands for liberty and freedom. The "Revolutionary Flag of Lares" was used in the short-lived rebellion against Spain in what became known as El Grito de Lares (The Cry of Lares). The flag was proclaimed the national flag of the "Republic of Puerto Rico" by Francisco Ramírez Medina, who was sworn in as Puerto Rico's first president, and placed on the high altar of the Catholic Church of Lares, thus becoming the first Puerto Rican Flag. The original Lares flag was taken by a Spanish army officer as a war prize. Many years later it was returned and transferred to the Puerto Rican people. It is now exhibited in the University of Puerto Rico's Museum.

In 1873, following the abdication of Amadeo I of Spain and with Spain's change from Kingdom to Republic, the Spanish government issued a new colonial flag for Puerto Rico. The new flag, which was used until 1873, resembled the flag of Spain, with the difference that it had the coat of arms of Puerto Rico in the middle. Spain's flag once more flew over Puerto Rico with the restoration of the Spanish kingdom in 1874, until 1898 the year that the island became a possession of the United States under the terms of the Treaty of Paris (1898) in the aftermath of the Spanish–American War.

Current design

Juan de Mata Terreforte, a leader of the Grito de Lares revolt who fought alongside Manuel Rojas, was exiled to New York City. He joined the Puerto Rican Revolutionary Committee and was named its vice-president. Terreforte and the members of the Revolutionary Committee adopted the Flag of Lares as their standard. In 1892, the committee was presented with the design of the current flag of Puerto Rico. The new flag's design has been attributed to various Puerto Ricans who were members of the Puerto Rican Revolutionary Committee in New York City.

Some sources document Francisco Gonzalo Marín with presenting a Puerto Rican flag prototype in 1895 for adoption by the Puerto Rican Revolutionary Committee in New York City. Marín has since been credited by some with the flag's design. There is a letter written by Juan de Mata Terreforte which gives credit to Marin. The original contents of the letter in Spanish are the following:

"La adopción de la bandera cubana con los colores invertidos me fue sugerida por el insigne patriota Francisco Gonzalo Marín en una carta que me escribió desde Jamaica. Yo hice la proposición a los patriotas puertorriqueños que asistieron al mitin de Chimney Hall y fue aprobada unánimemente."

Which translated in English states the following:

"The adoption of the Cuban flag with inverted colors was suggested to me by the distinguished patriot Francisco Gonzalo Marín in a letter he wrote to me from Jamaica. I made the proposal to the Puerto Rican patriots who attended the meeting at Chimney Hall and it was approved unanimously."

According to other accounts on June 12, 1892, disputed by scholar Armando Martí, Antonio Vélez Alvarado was at his apartment at 219 Twenty-Third Street in Manhattan, when he stared at a Cuban flag for a few minutes, and then took a look at the blank wall in which it was being displayed. Vélez suddenly perceived an optical illusion, in which he perceived the image of the Cuban flag with the colors in the flag's triangle and stripes inverted. Almost immediately he visited a nearby merchant, Domingo Peraza, from whom he bought some crepe paper to build a crude prototype. He later displayed his prototype in a dinner meeting at his neighbor's house, where the owner, Micaela Dalmau vda. de Carreras, had invited José Martí as a guest. Martí was pleasantly impressed by the prototype, and made note of it in a newspaper article published in the Cuban revolutionary newspaper Patria, published on July 2 of that year. Acceptance of the prototype was slow in coming, but grew with time. Francisco Gonzalo Marín, who decided to have a proper flag sewn based on the prototype, presented the new flag's design in New York's "Chimney Corner Hall" a gathering place of independence advocates two years later. The Puerto Rican Flag (with the light blue triangle) soon came to symbolize the ideals of the Puerto Rican independence movement.

In a letter written by Maria Manuela (Mima) Besosa, the daughter of the Puerto Rican Revolutionary Committee member Manuel Besosa, she stated that she sewed the flag. This created a belief that her father could have been its designer. In her letter she described the flag as one which consists of five stripes that alternate from red to white. Three of the stripes are red, and the other two are white. To the left of the flag is a light blue triangle that houses one white five-pointed star. Each part of this flag has its own meaning. The three red stripes represent the blood from the brave warriors. The two white stripes represent the victory and peace that they would have after gaining independence. The white star represented the island of Puerto Rico. The blue represents the sky and blue coastal waters. The triangle represents the three branches of government. Finally, it is also believed by some that it was Lola Rodríguez de Tió who suggested that Puerto Ricans use the Cuban flag with its colors reversed as the model for their own standard.  The color of the Cuban flag's blue stripes, however, was a darker shade of blue, according to Professor Martí.

Even though the local newspaper "El Imparcial" on January 17, 1948, stated that Vélez Alvarado was the "Prócer Que Creó Bandera Patria" (The Father of the Puerto Rican Flag) it may never be known who really designed the current flag; however, what is known is that on December 22, 1895, the Puerto Rican Revolutionary Committee officially adopted the design which represents the current flag. In 1897, Antonio Mattei Lluberas visited the Puerto Rican Revolutionary Committee in New York City to plan an uprising in Yauco. He returned to Puerto Rico with a Puerto Rican flag and on March 24, 1897, a group of men, led by Fidel Vélez, carried the Puerto Rican flag and attacked the barracks of Spanish Civil Guard of the town Yauco during the revolt against Spanish rule which became known as the "Intentona de Yauco" (Attempted Coup of Yauco). The revolt, which was the second and last major attempt against the Spaniards in the island, was the first time that the flag of Puerto Rico was used on Puerto Rican soil.

Outlawing the flag

From December 10, 1898 (the date of the annexation of Puerto Rico by the United States) up until 1952, it was considered a felony to display the Puerto Rican flag in public; the only flag permitted to be flown on the island was the flag of the United States. However, the Puerto Rican flag was often used in the political assemblies of the pro-independence Liberal Party of Puerto Rico and in defiance by the Puerto Rican Nationalist Party. In 1932, the Nationalist Party used the flag as its emblem during the elections and in their parades.

On May 21, 1948, a bill was introduced before the Puerto Rican Senate which would restrain the rights of the independence and Nationalist movements on the island. The Senate, controlled by the Partido Popular Democrático (PPD) and presided by Luis Muñoz Marín, approved the bill that day. This bill, which resembled the anti-communist Smith Act passed in the United States in 1940, was enacted under the name Ley de la Mordaza (Gag Law) on June 10, 1948, when signed by the U.S.-appointed governor of Puerto Rico, Jesús T. Piñero.

Under this new law it would be a crime to print, publish, sell, or exhibit any material intended to paralyze or destroy the insular government; or to organize any society, group or assembly of people with a similar destructive intent. It made it illegal to sing a patriotic song, and reinforced the 1898 law that had made it illegal to display the flag of Puerto Rico, with anyone found guilty of disobeying the law in any way being subject to a sentence of up to ten years imprisonment, a fine of up to US$10,000, or both. Later that same year Puerto Ricans were permitted to elect a governor and they elected Luis Muñoz Marín. During the Jayuya Uprising of 1950 against United States rule, members of the Nationalist party placed the Puerto Rican flag on top of the town hall; the flag was later taken down by a soldier.

Formal adoption
In 1952, Governor Luis Muñoz Marín and his administration adopted the Puerto Rican flag which was originally designed in 1892, and proclaimed it the official flag of Puerto Rico. The official adaptation of the flag has been interpreted by some as a ploy by Muñoz Marin to neutralize the independence movement in his own party. There were some differences between the original flag of 1892 and the one of 1952 and the meaning of the colors was officially changed. Now the white bars stood for the republican form of government, rather than representing the victory and peace that Puerto Ricans were supposed to have after gaining independence. The sky-blue of the triangle in the original flag was changed to dark blue, resembling that of the flag of the United States, to keep it distanced from its revolutionary roots. For nationalist leader Pedro Albizu Campos, having the flag represent the government was a desecration, while the independence party accused the government of "corrupting beloved symbols". In 1995, the government of Puerto Rico began to use the sky-blue version once more. The government of Puerto Rico issued a regulation in regard to the use of the Puerto Rican flag titled: "Reglamento sobre el Uso en Puerto Rico de la Bandera del Estado Libre Asociado de Puerto Rico; Reglamento Núm. 5282." (Regulations in regard to the use in Puerto Rico of the flag of Commonwealth of Puerto Rico; Regulation No. 5282). In the regulation's "Artículo 2: Definiciones" and "Artículo 2: Descripción y simbolismo" (Article 2: Definitions and Article 2: Description and symbolism) the government specifies the colors to be used but does not specify any official color tones or shades and as such it is not unusual to see the flag with either tone of blue flown in official settings in Puerto Rico.

Symbol of pride, defiance, and protest
Among the many occasions in which the flag has been used as a symbol of pride was when the flag arrived in South Korea during the Korean War. On August 13, 1952, while the men of Puerto Rico's 65th Infantry Regiment (United States) were being attacked by enemy forces on Hill 346, the regiment unfurled the Puerto Rican Flag for the first time in history in a foreign combat zone. During the ceremony Regimental Chaplain Daniel Wilson stated the following:

 The Commanding Officer Colonel Juan César Cordero Dávila was quoted as saying: 

On various occasions the flag has been used as a symbol of defiance and protest. In the 1954 attack of the United States House of Representatives in a protest against United States rule of the island, Nationalist leader Lolita Lebrón shouted "¡Viva Puerto Rico Libre!" ("Long live a Free Puerto Rico!") and unfurled the flag of Puerto Rico. On November 5, 2000, Alberto De Jesus Mercado, better known as Tito Kayak, and five other Vieques activists stepped onto the top deck of the Statue of Liberty in New York City, then placed a Puerto Rican flag, with the triangle darker than the light-blue version on the statue's crown, reenacting an earlier protest in the 1970s asking for the release of Puerto Rican prisoners, this time in protest of the United States Navy usage of the island of Vieques as a bombing range.

On March 15, 2009, several Puerto Rican flags were aboard the Space Shuttle Discovery during its flight into outer space. Joseph M. Acaba, the first astronaut of Puerto Rican descent, who was assigned to the crew of STS-119 as a Mission Specialist Educator, carried on his person the flag as a symbol of his Puerto Rican heritage. Acaba presented Governor Luis Fortuño and Secretary of State Kenneth McClintock with two of the flags during his visit in June 2009. Those two flags' triangles had a darker blue hue.

The flag is also the subject of the song "Qué Bonita Bandera" ("What a beautiful flag") written in 1968 and made popular by Puerto Rican folksinger Florencio "Ramito" Morales Ramos. Astronaut Acaba requested that the crew be awakened on March 19, 2009 (Day 5 in space), with this song, as performed by José González and Banda Criolla.

Black flag

Since at least 2016 an all-black rendition of the flag of Puerto Rico has been a symbol of Puerto Rican independence, resistance, and civil disobedience. A door at 55 Calle San José, painted with a mural depicting the traditional red, white, and blue Puerto Rican flag, had become a familiar image of Old San Juan. During the early morning of July 4, 2016 a group of women with the group Artistas Solidarixs y en Resistencia (Artists in Solidarity and Resistance) repainted the door in stark black and white. The original focus of protest was the Puerto Rico Oversight, Management, and Economic Stability Act (PROMESA), just signed into law by President Barack Obama. The act created the Financial Oversight and Management Board for Puerto Rico responsible for managing the island's debt. The Board has been criticized by many sectors as an act of colonialism. The black flag has become a common symbol of protest throughout Puerto Rico, and can be found on tourist items.

Diplomatic contact regarding similar flags

In the 1950s Puerto Rico contacted Norway's Foreign Ministry in an attempt to have Norwegian shipping company Det Stavangerske Dampskibsselskap stop using a flag that has a significant likeness to Puerto Rico's flag. Norway has not legally challenged the shipping company's position that their flag is older than Puerto Rico's. The shipping company's flag is still in use .

Gallery
Some of the flags which have at one time or another flown over Puerto Rican soil prior to Puerto Rico becoming a United States Territory:

See also

 The Puerto Rican Day
List of Puerto Rican flags
 Coat of arms of Puerto Rico
 Seal of Puerto Rico

References

Further reading
 Act No.1, Approved July 24, 1952.
 Regulations on the Use of the Puerto Rico flag. Núm. 5282, August 3, 1995

External links

 
 Puerto Rico flags at Vexilla mundi
 The Flag of The Jatibonicu Taíno Tribal Nation
  Academic Study on blue triangle in Puerto Rico flag

Puerto Rico
Puerto Rico
National symbols of Puerto Rico
History of Puerto Rico